Naeem Islam, often abbreviated as Naeem Islam Jr.; (born 19 October 1994) is a Bangladeshi cricketer. Naeem is a right-handed batsman and a left-arm orthodox spin bowler who plays for Chittagong Division. Early in his career, he was playing for the Bangladesh national under-19 cricket team. He made his First-class debut for Rajshahi Division cricket team against Chittagong Division cricket team in 2011; taking 3 wickets on that's match. He made his List-A debut 2 years later. He made his T20 debut 9 months before the List-A one.

References

External links

1994 births
Bangladeshi cricketers
Chittagong Division cricketers
Rajshahi Division cricketers
Rangpur Division cricketers
Rajshahi Royals cricketers
Khulna Tigers cricketers
Gazi Tank cricketers
Legends of Rupganj cricketers
Mohammedan Sporting Club cricketers
Abahani Limited cricketers
Living people
Shinepukur Cricket Club cricketers